San Rafael is a municipality in the Honduran department of Lempira.

It is one of the farthest municipalities of the Lempira department of Honduras. The best way to get to the municipality capital is via Santa Bárbara department, passing by El Nispero and San Jeronimo municipalities of this department.

History 
In the census of 1887 it appears with the name of "El Conal" village, of La Iguala municipality, and until 17 July 1900 it was granted the category of municipality, in the administration of President Terencio Sierra.

Geography 
To get to the municipality capital it is necessary to go up and down through very steep mountains. The vegetation changes as going up and down these mountains, but the Pine forests are predominant. In a few cases there can be seen spots of different kinds of trees, their purpose is to provide shade to the coffee plantations. The weather is mostly cool, except in summer. Since it is relatively near the "Lago de Yojoa" area, the precipitation is a little higher than the rest of the department.

Boundaries 
Its boundaries are: 
North : La Unión municipality and Santa Bárbara department.
South : La Iguala municipality.
East  : Santa Bárbara department.
West  : La Iguala municipality.
Surface Extents: 101 km²

Resources 

The most important activity is coffee plantations. Beans and Corn crops are next, but mostly for local consumption as well as raising cattle. It is worth mentioning that there are a few handcrafts producers of several things such as hats,"petates"(some sort of a carpet) of reed. They obtain the water from wells and some streams nearby. As does the rest of the department it has electricity and mobile communication services. The bus services are more common for Santa Barbara.

Population 
Population:For the year 2001 this municipality had 10,468 people, this figure was the base for an estimate, and the result for 2015 is the figure of 13,769 people.
Villages: 9
Settlements: 53

Demographics
At the time of the 2013 Honduras census, San Rafael municipality had a population of 13,410. Of these, 55.97% were Mestizo, 34,99% Indigenous (34.76% Lenca), 6.17% White and 2.88% Black or Afro-Honduran.

Tourism 

It takes about 2.5 hours to get there from the city of Santa Barbara and the road is in much better conditions. The other way is via the city of Gracias, and it is about 60 km from it. It is necessary to take the common road to La Iguala and La Unión, first passing by the "Puca" mountain and then some other steep mountains. The main disadvantage of this 2nd way is that the road needs to be repaired. The views of the coffee plantations are just awesome, and so are the rest of the landscapes provided by the big and steep mountains mentioned earlier in this article, this includes the views to Santa Bárbara department. The hospitality of its inhabitants is another feature, a proof of this is the sign that says: "En San Rafael, Nadie es Extraño", meaning: "In San Rafael, Nobody is a stranger". There are some groceries stores and one hostel, but it is not a recommendable place to stay in.
Local Holidays: "San Rafael"  day on 29 September.

References

External links

Municipalities of the Lempira Department